Edis Mulalić (born 23 October 1975) is a Bosnian professional football manager and former player who is the manager of Bosnian Premier League club Željezničar.

Born in Sarajevo, he is best known for playing for hometown club Željezničar, making over 300 appearances for the club in all competitions.

Club career
Born in Sarajevo, SFR Yugoslavia, Mulalić started his career with hometown club Željezničar on 4 occasions with whom he has won 3 league titles, 2 cups and 3 supercups. He played 220 league games for Željezničar and 322 games in all competitions. In Bosnia and Herzegovina, he also played for TOŠK Tešanj.

Mulalić also played in Germany for Uerdingen 05, Eintracht Frankfurt with whom he won the 2. Bundesliga, and Hamm. He finished his playing career in 2010 winning one of the three league titles throughout his career as club captain with Željezničar at the age of 35.

International career
Mulalić made his debut for Bosnia and Herzegovina in a March 1999 friendly game away against Hungary and has earned a total of 2 caps, scoring no goals. His second and final international was a March 2000 friendly game against Jordan.

Managerial career

Željezničar
Mulalić took over Željezničar during the 2015–16 season in September 2015. Under his lead, Željezničar recorded impressive 12 matches without losing in the national league, nine of them being straight victories. Along the way, the club beat fierce city rivals Sarajevo both home and away, a first time the club has beaten Sarajevo away at Asim Ferhatović Hase Stadium in 12 years.

In the Bosnian Cup competition, Mulalić led Željezničar to the semi finals, comprehensively losing to Sloboda Tuzla 2–5 on aggregate. He controversially got sacked after a draw against Rudar Prijedor on 7 May 2016, just one game before the end of the season.

Dečić
In September 2016, Mulalić was named the new manager of Montenegrin First League side Dečić. He made the biggest result in the club's history by finishing 5th in the league. After the end of the season, Mulalić decided to leave the club.

Mladost Doboj Kakanj
In June 2017, Mulalić came back to Bosnia and Herzegovina and became the new manager of Bosnian Premier League club Mladost Doboj Kakanj. After 4 league rounds Mladost were first on the league table. When the winter break started Mladost were 6th. In April 2018, about a month and a half before the end of the season, Mulalić left the club as it already secured safety from relegation. It was unsure why he left, but it was said that he left because of the thought of "the games being rigged." When Mulalić left, Maldost were 7th in the league, while at the end they finished 8th.

Rudar Pljevlja
On 21 July 2018, Mulalić was named manager of another Montenegrin First League club, Rudar Pljevlja. On 24 December 2018, Mulalić, alongside some of the players left the club due to financial problems that it had over the past months. Both sides said that they were on good terms.

Titograd
On 31 January 2019, Mulalić became the new manager of yet another Montenegrin club, Titograd. After only 2 months as Titograd manager, he resigned from the role after a loss against Zeta.

Return to Rudar Pljevlja
In July 2019, more than half a year after leaving the club, Mulalić came back to Montenegro and once again became the manager of Rudar Pljevlja. In his first game in his second mandate as the club's manager, Mulalić's Rudar Plevlja lost 2–0 away in a league match against Budućnost Podgorica on 5 August 2019. His first win since his return to Rudar came on 14 August 2019, in a 0–1 away league win against Mulalić's former team Titograd.

Return to Dečić
On 21 July 2020, Mulalić returned to Dečić and became the club's new manager. He left Dečić in September 2021.

Return to Željezničar
On 7 January 2022, Željezničar appointed Mulalić as manager for the second time. His first competitive game back in charge of Željezničar ended in a 2–0 away loss against Velež Mostar on 25 February 2022. Mulalić was victorious in his first Sarajevo derby since his return as manager, beating rivals Sarajevo on 5 March 2022.

On 9 April 2022, he managed Željezničar to a 3–0 win against Leotar, the club's biggest league win of the season.

Mulalić's first match in the 2022–23 season saw his team draw against Leotar on 16 July 2022.

Managerial statistics

Honours

Player
Eintracht Frankfurt 
2. Bundesliga: 1997–98

Željezničar 
Bosnian Premier League: 2000–01, 2001–02, 2009–10
Bosnian Cup: 1999–00, 2000–2001
Bosnian Supercup: 1998, 2000, 2001

References

External links

1975 births
Living people
Footballers from Sarajevo
Association football fullbacks
Bosnia and Herzegovina footballers
Bosnia and Herzegovina international footballers
FK Željezničar Sarajevo players
KFC Uerdingen 05 players
Eintracht Frankfurt players
NK TOŠK Tešanj players
Premier League of Bosnia and Herzegovina players
2. Bundesliga players
First League of the Federation of Bosnia and Herzegovina players
Bosnia and Herzegovina expatriate footballers
Expatriate footballers in Germany
Bosnia and Herzegovina expatriate sportspeople in Germany
Bosnia and Herzegovina football managers
FK Željezničar Sarajevo managers
FK Dečić managers
FK Mladost Doboj Kakanj managers
FK Rudar Pljevlja managers
OFK Titograd managers
Premier League of Bosnia and Herzegovina managers
Bosnia and Herzegovina expatriate football managers
Expatriate football managers in Montenegro
Bosnia and Herzegovina expatriate sportspeople in Montenegro